Nibong Tebal may refer to:
Nibong Tebal
Nibong Tebal (federal constituency), represented in the Dewan Rakyat
Nibong Tebal (state constituency), formerly represented in the Penang State Legislative Assembly (1959–74)
Nibong Tebal Paper Mill, Malaysian paper and consumer goods company.